Odilón Romero Gutiérrez (born 24 October 1957) is a Mexican politician affiliated with the Party of the Democratic Revolution. He served as Deputy of the LX Legislature of the Mexican Congress representing Guerrero and previously served as municipal president of Ayutla de los Libres.

References

1957 births
Living people
Politicians from Guerrero
Party of the Democratic Revolution politicians
20th-century Mexican politicians
21st-century Mexican politicians
Municipal presidents in Guerrero
Deputies of the LX Legislature of Mexico
Members of the Chamber of Deputies (Mexico) for Guerrero